Same-sex marriage in Mississippi has been legal since June 26, 2015. On November 25, 2014, U.S. District Court Judge Carlton W. Reeves of the U.S. District Court for the Southern District of Mississippi ruled that Mississippi's ban on same-sex marriage was unconstitutional. Enforcement of his ruling was stayed pending appeal to the Fifth Circuit Court of Appeals. On June 26, 2015, the U.S. Supreme Court ruled in Obergefell v. Hodges that the denial of marriage rights to same-sex couples is unconstitutional under the U.S. Constitution. On June 29, Attorney General Jim Hood ordered clerks to issue marriage licenses to same-sex couples. On July 1, the Fifth Circuit lifted its stay and Judge Reeves ordered an end to Mississippi's enforcement of its same-sex marriage ban. However, until July 2, 2015, several counties in Mississippi continued to refuse to issue marriage licenses, including DeSoto, Jasper, Jones, Newton, Pontotoc, Simpson and Yalobusha.

Legal history
In 1978, a same-sex couple was refused a marriage license. In 1994, another same-sex couple, Todd Emerson and Luis Cintron, applied for a license in Ocean Springs but were rejected.

Restrictions
On August 24, 1996, Governor Kirk Fordice issued an executive order banning same-sex marriage in the state. On January 10, 1997, the Mississippi State Senate passed a bill banning same-sex marriage in the state. On February 5, 1997, the House of Representatives passed the bill, and Governor Kirk Fordice signed it into law on February 12. It went into effect on the same day.

On March 1, 2004, the Mississippi House of Representatives, by a 97 to 17 vote, approved Amendment 1, a constitutional amendment defining marriage as "only between a man and a woman" and denying recognition to same-sex marriages from other jurisdictions. The Mississippi Senate passed it on April 7 by a 51 to 0 vote, and voters approved it on November 4 with 86% of the vote.

Lawsuits

Campaign for Southern Equality v. Bryant
The Campaign for Southern Equality and two lesbian couples filed suit in federal district court on October 20, 2014, challenging Mississippi's statutory and constitutional denial of marriage rights to same-sex couples. Each of the couples was raising two children and one couple had previously married in Maine. Their principal attorney was Roberta Kaplan, who had argued United States v. Windsor before the U.S. Supreme Court. They named as defendants Governor Phil Bryant and Attorney General Jim Hood, and the Hinds County circuit clerk who denied a marriage license to one of the plaintiff couples. U.S. District Court Judge Carlton W. Reeves held a hearing on motions for summary judgment on November 12. He ruled for the plaintiffs on November 25, finding that the state's ban did not survive rational basis review. Although Fifth Circuit precedent prevented him from using a stricter standard when considering discrimination on the basis of sexual orientation, he argued at length that the proper standard to use would be "heightened scrutiny" and he suggested the Fifth Circuit consider revisiting the question. He stayed his ruling for 14 days to allow the defendants to request a longer stay from the Fifth Circuit Court of Appeals or the U.S. Supreme Court.

The state defendants asked the Fifth Circuit for a stay pending appeal the next day. This stay was immediately opposed by the plaintiffs, who also filed a motion to expedite the appeal to coincide with hearings for a Texas case, De Leon v. Perry, and a Louisiana case, Robicheaux v. George. On December 4, the Fifth Circuit agreed to expedite the case, but not to consolidate oral arguments with its other same-sex marriage cases. It issued a stay pending appeal the same day. The Fifth Circuit heard oral arguments on January 9, 2015, before Judges Patrick Higginbotham, Jerry Edwin Smith, and James E. Graves Jr.

Czekala-Chatham v. Melancon
A lesbian couple, residents of Mississippi who had married in California in 2008, asked the state to recognize their marriage in order to allow them to divorce. The lawsuit was filed in DeSoto County, in Mississippi's Third District Chancery Court, in September 2013. The Mississippi Attorney General's office intervened in their divorce suit, Czekala-Chatham v. Melancon. The plaintiffs contended that "there can be no legitimate state purpose in allowing bigamous or incestuous couples to divorce and not allowing the same remedy to same-sex couples". The Third District Chancery Court dismissed their case for lack of jurisdiction. On appeal, the Mississippi Supreme Court took jurisdiction and allowed Governor Bryant, represented by the Alliance Defending Freedom, to intervene to support the state's position. That court heard oral arguments on January 21, 2015. On February 24, the court, after noting that all parties agreed proceedings should be stayed pending action by the U.S. Supreme Court in related cases, asked for additional briefs. Six justices supported that request, one objected that nothing would be gained, and two objected that it was only "a delay tactic" and the court should find the state's ban on same-sex marriage unconstitutional.

On July 2, 2015, Attorney General Hood, citing the previous week's decision by the U.S. Supreme Court in Obergefell,  asked the court to grant the divorce he had previously opposed. On November 5, 2015, in a 5–4 ruling, the Mississippi Supreme Court remanded the case to the Third District Chancery Court in light of Obergefell. The court ruled that the plaintiffs' requested relief, which the Attorney General had already agreed, was consistent with Obergefell and thus ruled in favor of Czekala-Chatham. Forming the five-justice majority were Justices Bill Waller Jr., Michael K. Randolph, Ann Hannaford Lamar, David A. Chandler, and Randy G. Pierce. Justices Josiah D. Coleman and Jess H. Dickinson each joined each other's dissents, disagreeing with Obergefell and questioning the decision's constitutional authority. Justice Pierce, joined by Chandler, wrote a separate concurrence accusing Justices Coleman and Dickinson of violating their oath of office by refusing to follow a ruling of the U.S. Supreme Court. Justice Leslie D. King, joined by James W. Kitchens, dissented, though they agreed Czekala-Chatham received the proper relief. Justice King wrote that, "While I am satisfied that the right result for Czekala-Chatham has been reached, I believe this Court does a great disservice to the jurisprudence of this State by reaching such result in an order, rather than issuing a precedential opinion. Consequently, I object to issuing this decision via order."

On December 1, 2015, Chancellor Mitchell Lundy, Jr. granted the divorce. He apologized to Czekala-Chatham for denying the original divorce in December 2013, but explained that he felt he had no other choice due to Mississippi's refusal to recognize their marriage at the time.

Obergefell v. Hodges
On June 26, 2015, the U.S. Supreme Court ruled in Obergefell v. Hodges that the denial of marriage rights to same-sex couples violates the Due Process and Equal Protection clauses of the Fourteenth Amendment. Following the decision, Attorney General Jim Hood said: "The Supreme Court's decision is not immediately effective in Mississippi. It will become effective in Mississippi, and circuit clerks will be required to issue same-sex marriage licenses, when the 5th Circuit lifts the stay" and allows Judge Reeves' order to take effect. Governor Bryant and Lieutenant Governor Tate Reeves condemned the ruling. State Representative Andy Gipson, chair of the Mississippi House Judiciary Committee, suggested the state should consider having "no marriage certificate sponsored by the state".

The plaintiffs filed a motion the same day asking the Fifth Circuit to lift its stay of that order. Attorney General Hood did not oppose that motion, but Governor Bryant did. On June 29, Hood issued an email to county clerks to clarify his earlier statement which, he wrote, "seems to have been misinterpreted as prohibiting Circuit Clerks from issuing marriage licenses to same-sex couples. The statement was merely meant to explain that an order of the Fifth Circuit would be necessary to lift the stay." He wrote: "Obergefell is the law of the land. If a clerk has issued or decides to issue a marriage license to a same-sex couple, there will be no adverse action taken by the Attorney General against that circuit clerk on behalf of the State.... On the other hand, a clerk who refuses to issue a marriage license to a same-sex couple could be sued by the denied couple and may face liability." On July 1, the Fifth Circuit lifted its stay and returned the Campaign for Southern Equality case to the district court, where Judge Reeves ordered Mississippi and its agents to cease enforcing the state's constitutional and statutory restrictions on same-sex marriage. The last counties in Mississippi to refuse to issue marriage licenses, DeSoto, Jasper, Jones, Newton, Pontotoc, Simpson and Yalobusha counties, began issuing licenses on July 2, 2015.

The first same-sex couple to marry in Mississippi were Amber Hamilton and Annice Smith in Hattiesburg on June 26, just hours before Attorney General Hood instructed county clerks to wait for the Fifth Circuit to lift its stay.

Developments after legalization
On June 27, 2016, a federal judge ruled that clerks in Mississippi may not recuse themselves from issuing marriage licenses to same-sex couples based on their religious beliefs. U.S. District Judge Carlton W. Reeves said that the recusals on religious grounds granted by the Religious Liberty Accommodations Act, violated Obergefell v. Hodges, the U.S. Supreme Court ruling which legalized same-sex marriage nationwide. The decision was overturned on appeal by the Fifth Circuit on June 23, 2017, in Barber v. Bryant on the grounds that the plaintiffs lacked standing.

The Mississippi Supreme Court ruled in Strickland v. Day in April 2018 that married same-sex couples should have the same parenting rights as married opposite-sex couples. The court overturned the decision of a trial court that Strickland, a non-biological lesbian mother who was denied legal parentage for children she and her now ex-wife raised together, was a non-parent, and named her on her son's birth certificate as a parent. The court remanded the case to trial court for matters considering child support and custody.

Native American nations
The Domestic Relations Code of the Mississippi Band of Choctaw Indians recognizes all marriages which have been validly performed in another jurisdiction. The code defines marriage as a personal consensual relationship arising out of a civil contract, and does not expressly forbid same-sex marriages. On May 4, 2016, the Assistant Attorney General, Cheryl Hamby, stated in an official opinion that due to its recognition of Mississippi state law as a "valid means for marriage, same sex marriage is valid in tribal court. Additionally, the tribe will recognize a Mississippi same-sex marriage licence." It is likely that Choctaw society had a designation like two-spirit for individuals who were born male but wore women's clothing and performed everyday household work and artistic handiwork which were regarded as belonging to the feminine sphere, but a lot of traditional knowledge was lost during the adoption of Christianity and the Trail of Tears for those Choctaw forcibly removed to the Indian Territory. Choctaw author LeAnne Howe stated in a 2022 book, "Often they weren't just involved with other men but had many levels of relationships. They were also involved with our community in very special ways. They could be healers. They're people that protected our children because they embodied more than one thing. And what is part of Choctawan aesthetics is that we revere things that are unusual. Different. When you look at the spirit that's connected in [ohoyo holba], and when they put on that dress in olden times, they are saying 'the embodiment of many'." Some female-bodied two-spirit individuals use the term . It is unknown if Choctaw two-spirit individuals were historically allowed to marry.

Demographics and marriage statistics
Data from the 2000 U.S. census showed that 4,774 same-sex couples were living in Mississippi. Same-sex couples lived in all counties of the state, and constituted 0.8% of coupled households and 0.5% of all households in the state. Most couples lived in Hinds, Harrison and Rankin counties, but the counties with the highest percentage of same-sex couples were Tallahatchie (0.82% of all county households) and Marshall (0.74%). Same-sex partners in Mississippi were on average younger than opposite-sex partners, and more likely to be employed. However, the average and median household incomes of same-sex couples were lower than different-sex couples, and same-sex couples were also far less likely to own a home than opposite-sex partners. Individuals in same-sex relationships were also significantly more likely to be African American; 46% of people in same-sex unions were African American compared to 20.5% of people in married opposite-sex unions. 35% of same-sex couples in Mississippi were raising children under the age of 18, with an estimated 2,839 children living in households headed by same-sex couples in 2005.

Domestic partnerships
On September 5, 2014, the city council of Starkville voted 7–0 in favor of an ordinance establishing domestic partner benefits for city employees in same-sex relationships. On January 6, 2015, the council voted 5–2 to repeal the ordinance passed in September. On January 8, Mayor Parker Wiseman vetoed the repeal, but on January 21, the council voted 5–2 to override Wiseman's veto and repeal the domestic partnership ordinance.

Public opinion
In a 2016 Public Religion Research Institute (PRRI) poll, Mississippi was one of the only three U.S. states where a majority of residents opposed same-sex marriage, alongside Arkansas and West Virginia. In 2021, Mississippi was the state with the highest opposition to same-sex marriage in the entire country according to the PRRI.

{| class="wikitable"
|+style="font-size:100%" | Public opinion for same-sex marriage in Mississippi
|-
! style="width:190px;"| Poll source
! style="width:200px;"| Date(s)administered
! class=small | Samplesize
! Margin oferror
! style="width:100px;"| % support
! style="width:100px;"| % opposition
! style="width:40px;"| % no opinion
|-
| Public Religion Research Institute
| align=center| March 8–November 9, 2021
| align=center| ?
| align=center| ?
| align=center| 44%
|  align=center| 55%
| align=center| 1%
|-
| Public Religion Research Institute
| align=center| January 7–December 20, 2020
| align=center| 286 random telephoneinterviewees
| align=center| ?
|  align=center| 47%
| align=center| 33%
| align=center| 20%
|-
| Public Religion Research Institute
| align=center| April 5–December 23, 2017
| align=center| 586 random telephoneinterviewees
| align=center| ?
| align=center| 42%
|  align=center| 48%
| align=center| 10%
|-
| Public Religion Research Institute
| align=center| May 18, 2016–January 10, 2017
| align=center| 833 random telephoneinterviewees
| align=center| ?
| align=center| 37%
|  align=center| 56%
| align=center| 7%
|-
| Public Religion Research Institute
| align=center| April 29, 2015–January 7, 2016
| align=center| 753 random telephoneinterviewees
| align=center| ?
| align=center| 25%
|  align=center| 65%
| align=center| 10%
|-
| New York Times/CBS News/YouGov
| align=center| September 20–October 1, 2014
| align=center| 826 likely voters
| align=center| ± 4.5%
| align=center| 29%
|  align=center| 56%
| align=center| 15%
|-
| Public Policy Polling
| align=center| November 15–17, 2013
| align=center| 502 voters
| align=center| ± 4.4%
| align=center| 22%
|  align=center| 69%
| align=center| 9%
|-
| Greenberg Quinlan Rosner Research/Target Point Consulting
| align=center| June 26–July 9, 2013
| align=center| 640 adults
| align=center| ± 3.87%
| align=center| 36%
|  align=center| 55%
| align=center| 9%
|-
| Public Policy Polling
| align=center| November 4–6, 2011
| align=center| 796 likely voters
| align=center| ± 3.5%
| align=center| 13%
|  align=center| 78%
| align=center| 9%
|-

See also
LGBT rights in Mississippi
Same-sex marriage in the United States

References

External links
Campaign for Southern Equality v. Bryant, U.S. District Court for the Southern District of Mississippi, November 25, 2014

2015 in LGBT history
LGBT rights in Mississippi
Mississippi
2015 in Mississippi